The Edison Twins is a Canadian children's television program which ran for six seasons on CBC Television from March 3, 1984 to December 17, 1986. The Disney Channel also picked up the rights in the mid-1980s. Six seasons were produced by Nelvana.

Synopsis
The series stars Andrew Sabiston and Marnie McPhail as fraternal twins Tom and Annie Edison, Sunny Besen Thrasher as their mischievous little brother Paul, and Milan Cheylov as their bumbling friend Lance Howard. Brian George stars as their police officer friend Sgt. Paganee. The show focused on the adventures of the main cast as they stumbled onto one problem after another, using Tom and Annie's scientific wit to solve the situation.

Many episodes end with a short animated sequence illustrating a key scientific principle demonstrated in the preceding live action story.

The last name of "Edison" is a homage to the inventor Thomas Edison.

All six seasons are available via streaming through Amazon Video. In Canada, all seasons were available on shomi. The show has not been released on DVD, however.

Cast
Andrew Sabiston as Tom Edison 
Marnie McPhail as Annie Edison
Sunny Besen Thrasher as Paul

Episodes

Season 1 (1984)

Season 2 (1984–85)

Season 3 (1985)

Season 4 (1985–86)

Season 5 (1986)

Season 6 (1986)

References

External links

 Episode titles and air dates
 

1980s Canadian children's television series
1984 Canadian television series debuts
1986 Canadian television series endings
Canadian television series with live action and animation
CBC Television original programming
CBS original programming
Disney Channel original programming
Fictional duos
Fictional twins
Television duos
Television series about twins
Television series by Nelvana
Television shows filmed in Toronto
Thomas Edison